Horace Cooper Wrinch (1866 – October 19, 1939) was an English-born physician and political figure in British Columbia. He represented Skeena in the Legislative Assembly of British Columbia from 1924 to 1933 as a Liberal.

He was born in Kirby, Essex, the son of Leonard Wrinch, received his early education in England and came to Canada with his family at the age of 14. He continued his studies at the Ontario Agricultural College, at Albert College in Belleville, Ontario and Trinity College in Toronto. He married Elizabeth Jane Breckon. Wrinch interned at St. Michael's Hospital before coming to the Upper Skeena area as a medical missionary. Wrinch later moved to Hazelton, British Columbia. He established a hospital, later known as the Wrinch Memorial Hospital, and a school of nursing there in 1904. In 1910, Wrinch was ordained a Methodist minister. During his time in the assembly, Wrinch was among those lobbying for provincial health insurance. He retired from the practice of medicine in 1936, moving to Ontario for a short time before moving back west to Vancouver.

References 

1866 births
1939 deaths
British Columbia Liberal Party MLAs
Canadian Methodist ministers
Christian medical missionaries